The International Council for Ski Mountaineering Competitions (ISMC) located in the Floridablanca 84 in Barcelona was part of the Union Internationale des Associations d'Alpinisme (UIAA) and responsible for ski mountaineering and vertical race competitions. The ISMC, which was founded in 1999 as follow-up institution of the Comité International du Ski-Alpinisme de Compétition (CISAC), merged into the International Ski Mountaineering Federation (ISMF) in 2008.

ISMC competitions
 European Cups of Ski Mountaineering since 1992
 European Championships of Ski Mountaineering since 2001, prior by the CISAC since 1992
 World Championships of Ski Mountaineering since 2002
 World Cups of Ski Mountaineering since 2004

Age classes:
 Cadets (16–18 years)
 Juniors (19–20 years)
 Contenders(21–23 years)
 Seniors (> 23 years)

Members of the UIAA-ISMC

External links
 International Sky Mountaineering Council
 UIAA-ISMC, skimountaineering.org

References

International sports organizations
Ski mountaineering
Sport in Barcelona
International organisations based in Spain
Organizations established in 1999
Organizations disestablished in 2008
1999 establishments in Catalonia